Andron (also known as Andron: The Black Labyrinth) is a 2015 science fiction action film written and directed by Francesco Cinquemani and starring Alec Baldwin and Danny Glover.

Plot

Ten survivors are brainwashed and put into a maze where only one can survive. They are living in a world where people put their fates in the contestants' hands, ruled by the rich.
Based on an Italian TV series.

Cast
Leo Howard as Alexander
Gale Harold (credited as "Gale Morgan Harold III") as Julian
Michelle Ryan as Elanor
Antonia Campbell-Hughes as Valerie
Skin as Anita
Danny Glover as Chancellor Gordon
Alec Baldwin as Adam

Reception
The film has a 0% rating on Rotten Tomatoes based on six reviews.

References

External links
 
 

2015 films
Italian science fiction action films
British science fiction action films
Maltese science fiction films
Canadian science fiction action films
English-language Canadian films
English-language Italian films
2015 science fiction films
2010s English-language films
2010s Canadian films
2010s British films